H. Mukhamad Misbakhun, SE is an Indonesian businessman and politician from the Golkar party. Misbakhun elected to the People's Representative Council (DPR-RI) of the Republic of Indonesia in the 2009 legislative election for a term from 2009 to 2014 from the constituency of East Java II which includes Probolinggo, Pasuruan, city and town of Pasuruan Prolobilinggo from the Prosperous Justice Party. For a member of Parliament known Misbakhun very vocal against the Bank Century bailout case.

He was reelected for a second term in the 2014 legislative election.

References

Living people
Golkar politicians
Members of the People's Representative Council, 2009
Members of the People's Representative Council, 2014
Year of birth missing (living people)
Members of the People's Representative Council, 2019